This page details statistics of the AFC President's Cup.

General performances

By club

By nation

By coach

All-time top ten AFC President's Cup table

Number of participating clubs
The following is a list of clubs that played in the President's Cup group stages. The list is arrayed in alphabetical order of nation.

Team in Bold: qualified for knockout phase

References
 AFC President's Cup in the-AFC.com

Records and statistics